The 1978 American League Championship Series was a best-of-five playoff pitting the New York Yankees against the Kansas City Royals for the American League pennant and the right to represent the American League in the 1978 World Series. The Yankees defeated the Royals for the third straight year to win the pennant.

Background
The Royals won 92 games that year and won the Western Division title by five games over the Texas Rangers.  The Yankees overcame a midseason deficit of 14 games and went on to win a one-game playoff against the Boston Red Sox to win the Eastern crown and finish with 100 wins.

Unlike the prior two ALCS which went five games, this one took the Yankees only four games to wrap up, and the Yankees went on to represent the American League in the 1978 World Series. Notable performers in this series included Reggie Jackson, who hit two home runs, and Chris Chambliss, who had six base hits in 15 at bats. George Brett and Amos Otis were the hitting stars for the Royals.

Summary

New York Yankees vs. Kansas City Royals

Game summaries

Game 1

Prior to the start of this game, both teams had to deal with bad news.  Ron Guidry, he of the incredible 25–3 Cy Young Award-winning season, would be unavailable to start until Game 4, if played, at least.  Guidry pitched the AL East division tie-breaker game against the Boston Red Sox and was starting to have arm trouble.  Also, second baseman Willie Randolph would miss the entire postseason with a hamstring injury and be replaced by a platoon of Fred Stanley and Brian Doyle.  For the Royals, star George Brett was suffering from a bout of hemorrhoids.

Without Guidry, the Yankees went with young Jim Beattie.  Beattie pitched five shutout innings and Ken Clay went the rest of the way.  The Royals would manage just two hits and one run off the two young pitchers.

Meanwhile, the Yankee bats knocked Dennis Leonard and Steve Mingori around for 13 hits and four runs, Doyle chipping in an RBI single.  Reggie Jackson put an exclamation point on the win with a three-run homer in the eighth off Al Hrabosky.

Game 2

Royals' starter Larry Gura pitched six shutout innings and won with relief help from Marty Pattin and Al Hrabosky.  The Royals' hitting stars were Darrell Porter, Frank White, and Fred Patek with two RBIs each, Patek's on a home run.

Game 3

Yankee starter Catfish Hunter pitched a fine game, going six innings, except for one thing:  three consecutive home runs by George Brett.  Still, Hunter had a 4–3 lead after six thanks to a homer, RBI single, and sacrifice fly by Reggie Jackson.  Jackson also scored a run in the fourth when Fred Patek overthrew Darrell Porter at home plate as Jackson was attempting to score on a hit by Lou Piniella.

The Royals, however, got to Goose Gossage in the top of the eighth.  Amos Otis doubled to right and Porter singled him in to tie it.  After a Clint Hurdle single, Porter scored the go-ahead run on a groundout by Al Cowens.

But, the Yanks would not be denied.  After a one-out single by Roy White, Royals manager Whitey Herzog replaced his starter, left-hander Paul Splittorff, with right-hander Doug Bird to face Thurman Munson.  Munson then greeted Bird with a 460-foot, game-winning, two-run blast into the Yankee bullpen in deep left-center field.

Gossage retired the Royals in the ninth and got the win.

The other irony of this game, besides Brett's three homers in a losing effort, was that Reggie Jackson was so productive against Paul Splittorff after former manager Billy Martin's claims that Jackson couldn't hit Splittorff during the 1977 American League Championship Series the year prior.

Brett was the second player to hit three home runs in a League Championship Series game. Bob Robertson was the first, doing so in Game 2 of the 1971 NLCS.

Game 4

Yankee manager Bob Lemon decided to use the sore-armed Ron Guidry to close out the series at Yankee Stadium.  Guidry turned in an effective performance, going eight innings and giving up one run on seven hits and striking out seven.

It didn't start out that way, though.  George Brett led the game off with a triple off Guidry and Hal McRae immediately followed by driving in Brett with a single.  But, the Royals would come up zeros the rest of the way.  Meanwhile, Graig Nettles tied it with a homer in the second inning, and Roy White hit the deciding homer in the fifth off Dennis Leonard.

Guidry left in the ninth after giving up a leadoff double to Amos Otis and Goose Gossage set down the next three Royal batters to close out the series and win their third straight AL Pennant.

Composite box
1978 ALCS (3–1): New York Yankees over Kansas City Royals

See also
 1978 in baseball

References

External links
Series statistics at Baseball Reference

American League Championship Series
New York Yankees postseason
Kansas City Royals postseason
American League Championship Series
American League Championship Series
20th century in Kansas City, Missouri
American League Championship Series
American League Championship Series
1970s in the Bronx